Struthiola striata is a rounded, heather-like shrub of up to  high that is assigned to the Thymelaeaceae family. It is sometimes called ribbed capespray or featherhead in English and roemenaggie, katstertjie or veërtjie in Afrikaans. It grows on coastal flats and foothills in the Western Cape province of South Africa.

Taxonomy 
This species was first described as Struthiola striata by Jean-Baptiste Lamarck in 1792, based on a collection by the French gardener-botanist Joseph Martin in the Cape area (Cap B. Spei). Later botanists however, overlooked this name. Franz Wilibald Schmidt named the species S. sulcata in 1793, Henry Cranke Andrews in 1800 created the name S. imbricata, while Jens Wilken Hornemann assigned the name S. lateriflora to it in 1815. In 1843 Meissner distinguished two varieties, S. striata var. striata and S. striata  var. angustifolia. In 1857 he considered S. sulcata, S. imbricata and S. lateriflora synonyms of S. striata. Charles Henry Wright in 1915 in turn regarded S. striata var. angustifolia a synonym of S. striata.

Description 
The branches are initially covered in soft hairs pressed firmly to the surface, but become hairless when aging.
The leaves are in pairs opposing each other, more or less upright, overlapping each other, with the blade directly attached to the branche without a leaf stalk. When the leaves are young 3 to 5 stripes are visible along the length of the outward facing surface.

The flowers are seated in the axils of the leaves over a considerable length towards the tip of the branches, an inflorescence type called a spike. Four yellow, elliptic, fleshy, petal-like scales are implanted above and alternating with the sepal lobes, and are surrounded by stiff hairs that may be shorter or longer than the scales.

Differences with related species 
Struthiola has its flowers arranged in long spikes and each flower has 4 anthers, whereas Gnidia differs from it in having its flowers in short spikes, solitary or more often in heads, and the flowers have 8 or 10 anthers in 2 whorls. Both Lachnaea, Passerina and a few Gnidia-species lack scales on the calyx tubes. Both S. striata and S. tetralepis have four petal-like scales implanted at the opening of the calyx tube, while the many dozens of remaining Struthiola species have eight or twelve scales.

Distribution, ecology and conservation 
Struthiola striata is restricted to coast of the Western Cape province of South Africa, between Yzerfontein in the north and Mossel Bay in the east. It occurs in a vegetation type called sand fynbos where it grows 
on lower slopes and coastal sand flats. It is honey-scented at night and gets pollinated by moths. The continued survival of this species is considered to be of least concern because its populations are stable.

References 

Struthiola striata
Flora of South Africa